Nazlat 'Isa is a Palestinian village in the Tulkarm Governorate in the western West Bank, located  North of Tulkarm.

History
Ceramics from the  Byzantine era have been found here, as have cisterns and tombs.

In 1882,  the PEF's Survey of Western Palestine   described the village, then named Nuzlet el Masfy as: "A small village on the low hills, with  wells."

British Mandate era
In the 1922 census of Palestine conducted  by the British Mandate authorities, Nazlet Esa had a population of 203 Muslims, increasing in the 1931 census to 261  Muslims, living in 62 houses.

In the  1945 statistics  the population of Nazlat Isa was 380 Muslims,  with 2,030  dunams of land  according to an official land and population survey. Of this, 684 dunams were for plantations and irrigable land, 750 were used for cereals, while 12 dunams were built-up (urban) land.

Jordanian era
In the wake of the 1948 Arab–Israeli War, and after the 1949 Armistice Agreements, Nazlat 'Isa  came under Jordanian rule.

In 1961, the population of Nazlet 'Ise was  627.

Post 1967
Since the Six-Day War in 1967, Nazlat 'Isa  has been under Israeli occupation.

In 2003, during the  Second Intifada,  over 60 shops were destroyed by Israeli civil administration bulldozers. The Israeli civil administration claimed that the shops were demolished because they were built without a permit. Palestinians consider Israeli military curfews and property destruction to constitute collective punishment against innocent Palestinians. 

According to the Palestinian Central Bureau of Statistics, Nazlat 'Isa had a population of approximately 2,502 inhabitants in mid-year 2006. 8.7% of the population of Nazlat 'Isa were refugees in 1997. The healthcare facilities for Nazlat 'Isa are designated as MOH level 2.

Raferences

Bibliography

External links
   Welcome To Nazlat 'Isa
 Nazlat Issa
Survey of Western Palestine, Map 8:     IAA, Wikimedia commons 

Villages in the West Bank
Tulkarm Governorate
Municipalities of the State of Palestine